Hokkaidō 7th district is a single-member constituency of the House of Representatives in the Diet of Japan. It is located in Japan's northernmost prefecture Hokkaidō. In a 2002 redistricting and reapportionment, Hokkaidō lost one seat and what had been the Hokkaido 13th district in the 1996 and 2000 general elections was renamed the 7th district. The previous 7th district was split up: the largest part merged into the 6th district and the remaining areas merged into the 10th and 12th districts.

Electorate 
The 7th district is located in Eastern Hokkaidō and covers the Kushiro and Nemuro subprefectures, in the Japanese viewpoint theoretically including the "Northern Territories (Southern Kuriles) administered by the Russian Federation. As of 2009, 278,402 eligible voters were registered in the district.

The district has been represented by Liberal Democrat Yoshitaka Itō since 2009. In the 2009 general election, the 7th district was the only district countrywide where a Democratic incumbent lost their seat and the only district in Hokkaidō won by the LDP. In the previous election of 2005 when the LDP won a landslide victory, it was one of few districts where a Democrat could unseat a Liberal Democratic incumbent.

List of representatives

Election results

References 

Politics of Hokkaido
Districts of the House of Representatives (Japan)